Trelleborgs Fotbollsförening, more commonly known as Trelleborgs FF or simply Trelleborg, is a Swedish football club located in Trelleborg. Formed 6 December 1926, the club plays in Superettan, the second tier in the Swedish Football system. Trelleborgs FF has participated 17 times in Allsvenskan and once in the UEFA Cup where the team eliminated Blackburn Rovers in the 1994–1995 season.

Trelleborg have had a reputation of being a less fashionable provincial side, making the most of limited resources and a small fan base. The team has typically been recognised by performing goalkeepers, a strong defense and a good home record. In 2006 the team broke the Superettan record for longest period without conceding a goal.

The club is affiliated to the Skånes Fotbollförbund.

History

Promotion to top division and qualifying for the UEFA Cup 
The club won promotion to the top Swedish league for the first time in 1984. The club's glory days arrived in the early nineties when they won promotion to Allsvenskan for the second time and finished third in 1992, the so far best placement, fourth in 1993 and participated in the UEFA-cup. Tipped for demotion at the start of most seasons, the team scrambled through the late nineties with effective, but not very attractive, defensive long ball tactics. Trelleborg's stadium, Vångavallen, was even nicknamed "Tjongavallen" (from Swedish "Tjonga" – kicking a football far away without direction). The team was finally demoted in 2001 after a disappointing season.

Recent years 
The club gained promotion to the top league for the third time in 2003 just to be demoted directly, since it came after the Trelleborg board hired the Dane Ole Mørk, who was supposed to change the Trelleborg style of play into a more attractive short-passing game. In 2005, TFF finished eleventh in Superettan after a turbulent year, while 2006 became a successful year for the team. Three rounds before the end of Superettan 2006, Trelleborg stood as clear winners, thus gaining promotion to the 2007 Allsvenskan. Relegation was narrowly avoided with superior goal difference in 2007. In 2008 Tom Prahl, trainer during the success years in the early nineties, returned as head coach. Trelleborg finished at tenth place in an even season where Rasmus Bengtsson amongst others had an inspiring season. In 2009 the team finished at ninth place after a strong finish. In 2010 the teams tactics changed to a more creative and public friendly game style. The team finished fifth after a strong autumn, their best position since 1993, just to be relegated in 2011, after conceding 64 goals in 16 matches and finishing second last. In 2012, Trelleborg  was relegated from Superettan, and the following year they failed to re-qualify for Superettan by finishing third place in Division 1 (Swedish football). In 2014 they only avoided getting relegated from Division 1 (Swedish football) through goal difference, however, the next year they won the league and therefore qualified for the 2016 Superettan in which they finished third place and qualified for playoffs against Jönköpings Södra IF where they won 3-1 in aggregate and were promoted to Allsvenskan after a 6-year hiatus.

Achievements

League 
Superettan:
 Winners (1): 2006
 Runner-up (1): 2003
Division 1 Södra:
 Winners (1): 1991, 2015
 Runner-up (2): 1987, 1989
 UEFA Intertoto Cup: Winners (1): 1993

Players

Current squad

Out on loan

Management

Organisation

Technical staff

References

External links 

 Trelleborgs FF – official site
 True Blues – official supporter club site
 Ståplats – supporter site

 
Allsvenskan clubs
Sport in Trelleborg
Football clubs in Skåne County
Association football clubs established in 1926
1926 establishments in Sweden